Bréhal is a French surname. Notable people with the name include:

Jean Bréhal, French inquisitor-general who led the effort to rehabilitate Joan of Arc
Nicolas Bréhal (1952–1999), French novelist and literary critic

French-language surnames